Phorbas pustulosus, or the baseball glove sponge, is a species of demosponge known from the coast of South Africa and from the Patagonian Shelf.

Description 
This pale dirty peach sponge grows upright with its irregular branches forming a hand-like form. The surface is slightly rough and covered in bumps, also known as pustules. It is firm and tough.

Distribution 
The baseball glove sponge is known from the southern and western coasts of South Africa and from the Patagonian Shelf.

References 

Demospongiae